Thomas G. Woolston is a patent attorney, and the patented inventor of several online auction business methods. He is also the founder of MercExchange.
Mr. Woolston served in the US Air Force, has an undergraduate degree in electrical engineering from George Washington University and a law degree.  He has also worked for the CIA.

In 1995 Woolston filed his first patent application on on-line auction technology.  The patent was granted in December 1998.  He then founded MercExchange to commercialize his technology.  He has since had several other patents issue along with other coinventors.

eBay approached MercExchange to purchase the Woolston patents.  Negotiations broke down when Woolston discovered that eBay was already infringing the patents.  He sued eBay for patent infringement.  The patents were found to be valid and willfully infringed.  Damages to MercExchange by eBay's infringement were initially assessed at $35 million (later reduced to $25 million). 
However, the case also resulted in the clarification of the rules regarding the application of permanent injunctions in patent infringement cases. As a result, it is now much more difficult for non-practicing entities to obtain permanent injunctions.

Woolston patents

  Consignment nodes
  Method and apparatus for using search agents to search plurality of markets for items 
  Facilitating internet commerce through internetworked auctions 
  Facilitating electronic commerce through two-tiered electronic markets and auctions 
  Generating and navigating streaming dynamic pricing information

References

External links
 MercExchange home page

George Washington University School of Engineering and Applied Science alumni
George Washington University Law School alumni
American lawyers
American company founders